The Wisconsin State Golf Association (WSGA) established a Wisconsin Golf Hall of Fame in 1964 to honor distinguished amateurs for their significant contributions to the game of golf in Wisconsin.  The five charter members of this elite group, all "legends" who made their "mark" in Wisconsin amateur golf circles, were E.P. "Ned" Allis, Dick Cavanagh, Lynford Lardner, Billy Sixty, Sr., and Wilford Wehrle.

In 1975, the WSGA Hall of Fame Committee changed the induction policies to allow professionals, women and public links players to be considered for the Hall of Fame.  The first female to be inducted was Joyce Ziske Malison.  In 1980, Archie Dadian of Whitnall Park GC became the first public links player to be elected to the Hall of Fame.

At present, plaques of all inductees, which outline their achievements along with an engraved likeness, are on display at Golf House of Wisconsin in West Allis. 

The WSGA Hall of Fame Committee is composed of WSGA directors, golf professionals, women representatives, public links players and media delegates, who meet annually to review candidates.  Candidate consideration is extended to individuals with outstanding golf records, and to those who have made exceptional contributions to the game of golf.  All candidates must be at least 40 years of age and must receive at least 75% of the committee's votes.

Members
1964 - E.P. “Ned” Allis
1964 - Billy Sixty, Sr.
1964 - Wilford Werhle
1964 - Lynford Lardner, Jr.
1964 - R.P. “Dick” Cavanagh
1965 - Marue Carroll
1965 - Dr. Adolph C. “Buster” Bock
1965 - Bernard “Ben” Gleissner
1966 - Walter H. Gaedke
1966 - Daniel P. Steinberg, Jr.
1966 - Dr. Ernest Miller
1966 - James R. Anderson
1967 - Steve Caravello
1967 - Ray Billows
1967 - Gordon Kummer
1968 - Frank Woodside
1968 - Robert Crichton
1968 - Harry Simonson
1969 - Max Shimon
1969 - Carl E. Dietze
1969 - Robert A. Hipke
1970 - Bowden Davis
1970 - Burleigh Jacobs, Jr.
1970 - Edward J. Walsh
1975 - Manuel de la Torre
1975 - Francis Gallett
1975 - Joyce Ziske Malison
1975 - Johnny Revolta
1976 - Alvin R. "Butch" Krueger
1977 - Walter Leuenberger
1977 - James "Jimmy" Milward
1978 - Robert A. "Bobby" Brue
1979 - James R. Love, Jr.
1979 - Thomas "Tommy" Veech
1980 - Archie Dadian
1981 - Goldie Bateson
1981 - Mike Bencriscutto
1982 - Burns O. "Blackie" Nelthorpe
1982 - Gordon Watson
1983 - Carol Sorenson Flenniken
1983 - Steve Bull
1984 - Paula (Clauder) Garzotto
1985 - Oyvind Juul "O.J." Noer
1986 - Richard J. "Dick" Sucher
1988 - Don Iverson
1989 - Dennis Tiziani
1990 - Mary Mcmillin Fossum
1990 - Andy North
1991 - Gene Haas
1991 - Mark Bemowski
1992 - Alex Antonio
1992 - John M. Hayes
1993 - Katie (Ahern) Falk
1993 - Marilyn (Klumb) Williams
1994 - Mary Beth Nienhaus
1994 - Jeffrey Radder
1995 - Martha Nause
1997 - John Pallin
1999 - Carol Jean Sorenson Templin
2000 - Lou Warobick
2001 - George Hansen
2001 - Bernice Wall
2002 - Ralph "Butch" Schlicht
2002 - Bill Brodell
2003 - Mary Hafeman
2003 - Eddie Terasa
2004 - Herbert Kohler, Jr.
2004 - Bob Gregorski
2004 - Sherri Steinhauer
2005 - Gary Menzel
2005 - Monroe Miller
2006 - J. P. Hayes
2006 - David U. Cookson
2006 - Skip Kendall
2007 - Steve Stricker
2007 - Jerry Kelly
2008 - Don Johnson
2009 - Larry Tiziani
2009 - Jim Schuman
2010 - Pat Boyle
2011 - Tom Schmidt
2011 - Arnold Walker
2012 - David Miley
2012 - Sydney Wells
2013 - Tom Strong
2014 - Greg Dick
2015 - Mark Wilson
2015 - Joellyn Crooks
2016 - Sue Ginter
2016 - David Roesch
2017 - Gary D'Amato
2017 - Ryan Helminen
2017 - Maggie Leef

Footnotes

External links
Wisconsin Golf Hall of Fame official webpage (on Wisconsin State Golf Association website)

Golf in Wisconsin
Golf museums and halls of fame
State sports halls of fame in the United States
Halls of fame in Wisconsin
Sports museums in Wisconsin
Museums in Milwaukee County, Wisconsin
West Allis, Wisconsin
Awards established in 1964